This is a list of state scenic byways in Oregon. The byways are divided into two types: state scenic byways and touring routes.

In addition to the state-designated byways, Oregon has ten National Scenic Byways, of which four are All-American Roads.

Oregon State Scenic Byways 
Blue Mountain Scenic Byway
Elkhorn Scenic Byway
High Desert Discovery Scenic Byway
Journey Through Time Scenic Byway
Marys Peak to Pacific Scenic Byway
McKenzie River Scenic Byway
Over The Rivers & Through The Woods Scenic Byway
Trees to Sea Scenic Byway
Umpqua Scenic Byway

Tour Routes

Charleston to Bandon Tour Route
Cottage Grove Covered Bridge Tour Route
Cow Creek Tour Route
Diamond Loop Tour Route
East Steens Tour Route
Grande Tour Route
Myrtle Crrek-Canyonville Tour Route
Silver Falls Tour Route
Vineyard and Valley Tour Route

See also

References 

State Scenic Byways in Oregon
Scenic